Sir Edmund Wickham Lawrence  (born 14 February 1932) was the third governor-general of Saint Kitts and Nevis from 2013 to 2015. He was sworn in at midnight on 1 January 2013. Sir Edmund is Methodist. Sir Edmund taught in elementary schools in St. Kitts between 1951 and 1954. He graduated from the University of London in 1966 with a degree in Economics.

Following his graduation from the University of London, Sir Edmund lectured at Walbrook College in London from 1967 to 1969. He returned to St. Kitts and began an illustrious career.

In 1970, Sir Edmund established the St Kitts-Nevis-Anguilla National Bank, which has grown in assets from US$75 Thousand to over US$1 Billion making it the largest local bank in the Eastern Caribbean. Sir Edmund also established the National Bank Trust Company (NBTC) in 1972, the National Caribbean Insurance Company (NCIC) in 1973, and the St. Kitts and Nevis Morgtage and Investment Company (MICO) in 2001, together forming the National Bank Group of Companies.

He is a founding member of the Standing Committee of Chief Executives of Indigenous Commercial Banks (now termed the Caribbean Association of Banks) in the Caribbean Community (CARICOM). Sir Edmund held several high level executive positions and directorships in companies and corporations in the private and public sectors in St. Kitts and Nevis and throughout the Eastern Caribbean between 1971 and 2012.

In the 1999 New Year Honours, Sir Edmund was invested as an Officer of the Most Excellent Order of the British Empire (OBE).

In 2009, he was awarded the National Honour as Companion of the Star of Merit (CSM).

In 2010, Her Majesty Queen Elizabeth II awarded Sir Edmund Knight Commander of the Most Distinguished Order of St. Michael and St. George (KCMG), at Buckingham Palace, for his services to banking and finance.

In 2013, Her Majesty Queen Elizabeth II appointed Sir Edmund Knight Grand Cross of the most Distinguished Order of St. Michael and St. George (GCMG).

Sir Edmund continues active involvement in several non-profit organizations including the Brimstone Hill Fortress National Park Society and Rotary International.

Sir Edmund is married to Lady Hulda and they have six children.

In May 2015, Sir Edmund retired from his post of Governor-General of St Kitts and Nevis.

In November 2016, Sir Edmund was invested with the insignia of Knight Grand Cross of the Most Distinguished Order of St. Michael and St. George by His Royal Highness (HRH) Prince Henry (Harry) of Wales.

References 

1932 births
Governors-General of Saint Kitts and Nevis
Knights Grand Cross of the Order of St Michael and St George
Living people
Officers of the Order of the British Empire
Saint Kitts and Nevis businesspeople
Saint Kitts and Nevis economists